Haunted Heart is the second studio album by American country music singer Sammy Kershaw, released on March 9, 1993, through Mercury Records. It produced four singles: "She Don't Know She's Beautiful", the title track, "Queen of My Double-Wide Trailer", and "I Can't Reach Her Anymore". "She Don't Know She's Beautiful" was a number-one hit on the Billboard Hot Country Singles & Tracks chart for Kershaw in 1993, while the other three singles reached the top ten on the same chart. Like his debut album, Haunted Heart was certified platinum by the RIAA. "Cry Cry Darlin'" was previously recorded by several other artists, including Bill Monroe and Dolly Parton.

Track listing

Personnel

 Kenny Bell – acoustic guitar
 David Briggs – keyboards
 Melonie Cannon – background vocals
 Mike Chapman – bass guitar
 Costo Davis – keyboards
 Sonny Garrish – steel guitar, Dobro
 Steve Gibson – electric guitar
 Rob Hajacos – fiddle
 Bill Hullett – acoustic guitar
 Sammy Kershaw – lead vocals
 Jerry Kroon – drums
 Terry McMillan – harmonica, percussion
 Brent Mason – electric guitar
 Weldon Myrick – steel guitar, Dobro
 Ozzie Osment – fiddle
 Danny Parks – acoustic guitar, mandolin
 Larry Paxton – bass guitar
 Mike Severs – electric guitar
 Steve Turner – drums
 Shania Twain – background vocals
 John Willis – acoustic guitar
 Dennis Wilson – background vocals
 Curtis Young – background vocals

Track information and credits adapted from the album's liner notes.

Charts

Weekly charts

Year-end charts

Singles

Certifications

References

1993 albums
Sammy Kershaw albums
Albums produced by Buddy Cannon
Albums produced by Norro Wilson
Mercury Nashville albums